Homer Joseph "Stewie" Stewart (1915–2007) was an American aeronautical engineer, rocket propulsion expert, and Caltech professor, known as a pioneer in developing the first American satellites.

Biography
After graduating with a bachelor's degree from the University of Minnesota in 1936, Stewart matriculated at Caltech.

In 1940 Stewart graduated from Caltech with a Ph.D. in aeronautics. In 1938, two years before receiving his Ph.D., he became a Caltech faculty member. He taught aeronautics and meteorology, but for many years divided his time between serving on the Caltech faculty and doing research at the Jet Propulsion Laboratory (JPL).

In 1958 NASA (National Aeronautics and Space Administration) was formed, largely as a response to the USSR's 1957 launch of Sputnik 1. From 1958 to 1960, Stewart took a two-year leave of absence from Caltech to serve as NASA's director of planning and evaluation. He was in charge of calculating and analyzing the exhaust velocities required to lift rockets into the orbits planned for them.

In addition to contributing to the development of the WAC Corporal, MGM-29 Sergeant, and Jupiter-C rockets, he helped in preparations for Pioneer 4 and in the preliminary planning of the Apollo moon missions. He also recommended Cape Canaveral as a launching site. In 1959 Stewart and Wernher von Braun testified to Congress concerning the Soviet spacecraft and missile capabilities. Stewart was the chair of a committee formed to give advice on satellites to the US federal government.

Except for his two-years with NASA, Stewart remained on Caltech's faculty from 1938 until 1980, when he retired as professor emeritus professor of aeronautics.

In 1970 he was awarded the NASA Exceptional Service Medal. Upon his death Homer J. Stewart was survived by two daughters, one son, and two grandchildren.

Publications
 
 
 
 
 
 
 
 
  (transcript of radio interview of Homer J. Stewart conducted by Irving Bengelsdorf)

See also
 Smith–Putnam wind turbine

References

External links
 

American aerospace engineers
University of Minnesota alumni
California Institute of Technology alumni
California Institute of Technology faculty
People from Lapeer County, Michigan
1915 births
2007 deaths
20th-century American engineers